Dietmar Heinrich Nietan (born 25 May 1964) is a German politician of the Social Democratic Party (SPD) who has been serving as a member of the Bundestag from the state of North Rhine-Westphalia from 1998 till 2002 and since 2005. In addition to his parliamentary work, he has been serving as the Coordinator of German-Polish Intersocietal and Cross-Border Cooperation at the Federal Foreign Office in the coalition government of Chancellor Olaf Scholz since 2022.

In 2014, Nietan became the SPD's treasurer, making him part of the party's national leadership under current co-chairs Saskia Esken and Lars Klingbeil.

Political career 
Nietan became a member of the Bundestag for the second time in the 2017 German federal election. He is a member of the Committee on Foreign Affairs; in this capacity, he serves as his parliamentary group's rapporteur on the European Union's Common Foreign and Security Policy and relations to Turkey. He also served on the Committee on European Affairs from 1998 until 2005 and from 2009 until 2013. 

In addition to his committee assignments, Nietan is part of the German-Polish Parliamentary Friendship Group. From 2005 until 2009, he chaired the German Parliamentary Friendship Group with Belgium and Luxembourg.

Within the SPD parliamentary group, Nietan belongs to the Parliamentary Left, a left-wing movement.

In the negotiations to form a coalition government under the leadership of Chancellor Angela Merkel following the 2017 federal elections, Nietan was part of the working group on energy, climate protection and the environment, led by Armin Laschet, Georg Nüßlein and Barbara Hendricks.

In the negotiations to form a so-called traffic light coalition of the SPD, the Green Party and the Free Democratic Party (FDP) following the 2021 federal elections, Nietan was part of his party's delegation in the working group on foreign policy, defence, development cooperation and human rights, co-chaired by Heiko Maas, Omid Nouripour and Alexander Graf Lambsdorff.

Other activities

Corporate boards 
 Deutsche Druck- und Verlagsgesellschaft (ddvg), Member of the Supervisory Board

Non-profit organizations 
 European Council on Foreign Relations (ECFR), Member (since 2020)
 German Poland Institute (DPI), Member of the Board of Trustees
 German-Polish Science Foundation (DPWS), Member of the Board of Trustees
 Foundation "Remembrance, Responsibility and Future", Member of the Board of Trustees 
 Gustav Heinemann Civic Award, Member of the Board of Trustees
 Education and Science Workers' Union (GEW), Member
 German Federation for the Environment and Nature Conservation (BUND), Member

References

External links 

  
 Bundestag biography 

1964 births
Living people
Members of the Bundestag for North Rhine-Westphalia
Members of the Bundestag 2021–2025
Members of the Bundestag 2017–2021
Members of the Bundestag 2013–2017
Members of the Bundestag 2009–2013
Members of the Bundestag 2005–2009
Members of the Bundestag 2002–2005
Members of the Bundestag 1998–2002
Members of the Bundestag for the Social Democratic Party of Germany